Agenor Detofol commonly known as Agenor (born 11 December 1989) is a Brazilian footballer who plays as a goalkeeper for CEOV.

References

External links

1989 births
Living people
Association football goalkeepers
Brazilian footballers
Brazilian expatriate footballers
Brazil under-20 international footballers
Campeonato Brasileiro Série A players
Campeonato Brasileiro Série B players
Sport Club Internacional players
Criciúma Esporte Clube players
Joinville Esporte Clube players
Sport Club do Recife players
Fluminense FC players
CE Operário Várzea-Grandense players
J2 League players
SC Sagamihara players
Brazilian expatriate sportspeople in Japan
Expatriate footballers in Japan